HMS Providence was a sloop of the Royal Navy, famous for being commanded by William Bligh on his second breadfruit voyage between 1791 and 1794.

The Admiralty purchased Providence on the stocks from Perry & Co, Blackwall Yard in February 1791. She was launched on 23 April 1791 and commissioned under Bligh that month. She was coppered at Woolwich for the sum of £1,267, and then again at Deptford for £3,981.

Second Breadfruit Voyage
Rated as a sixth rate, she sailed for the Pacific on 2 August 1791 on Bligh's Second Breadfruit Voyage.  Bligh completed a mission to collect breadfruit trees and other botanical specimens from the Pacific, which he transported to the West Indies. Specimens were given to the Royal Botanic Gardens in St. Vincent.  Providence returned to Britain in August 1793, having been re-rated as a sloop on 30 September 1793.
In Adventure Bay, Tasmania, third lieutenant George Tobin made the first European drawing of an echidna.

Vancouver Expedition
She underwent another refit at Woolwich and was recommissioned in October 1793 under the command of Commander William Robert Broughton. Broughton was ordered to rejoin the Vancouver Expedition.

Providence was at Plymouth on 20 January 1795 and so shared in the proceeds of the detention of the Dutch naval vessels, East Indiamen, and other merchant vessels that were in port on the outbreak of war between Britain and the Netherlands.

Providence departed Britain on 15 February 1795. Reaching Monterrey long after the expedition made its final departure, Broughton  decided (correctly) that Vancouver would not have left his surveying task unfinished and departed to chart the coast of east Asia.

In the course of his explorations, he named Caroline Island
Carolina (which later became "Caroline") "in compliment to the daughter of Sir Philip Stephens of the Admiralty." This name superseded that given by Pedro Fernández de Quirós, a Portuguese explorer sailing on behalf of Spain; his account names the island "San Bernardo."

Providence voyaged to Asia as the crew surveyed the coast of Hokkaidō Muroran before wintering at Macau, August 1796. There Broughton purchased a small schooner which proved providential when, on 16 May 1797 Providence was wrecked when she struck a coral reef at Miyako-jima, south of Okinawa. The wreck is described by the Ship's Astronomer John Crosley in a passage copied from the ship's log book.  Broughton and his crew continued the mission in the schooner, exploring northeast Asia, and returned home in February 1799.

See also
 European and American voyages of scientific exploration

References

Bibliography
 
 Winfield, Rif, British Warships of the Age of Sail 1714–1792: Design, Construction, Careers and Fates, pub Seaforth, 2007,

External links
 

Sloops of the Royal Navy
Ships built by the Blackwall Yard
Shipwrecks in the Philippine Sea
1791 ships